The Monetary and Banking Research Institute (MBRI) (formerly known as Monetary and Banking Research Academy (MBRA)) is the research arm of the Central Bank of Iran.

Historical background
The Monetary and Banking Research Institute (MBRI) was established in 1990 out of necessity for a central repository of all the monetary and banking research in the country. Its activity is focused on research, consulting and publishing.

Duties
The most important goals and duties of the MBRI are as follows:

Performing economic researches for individuals and organizations, domestically and internationally.
Compiling economic data of Iran and other countries.
Cooperation with national and international universities and research institutions through workshops, seminars and conferences.

Organization
MBRI's organization consists of:

 Board of Trustees (the Central Bank of Islamic Republic of Iran's Governor as the President), 
 advisers, vice presidents, research groups, faculty members, 
 finance department, service group, publications, data bank, international affairs and conferences department, library and computer center.

See also

Central Bank of Iran
Banking and insurance in Iran
Economy of Iran
Iran Banking Institute

References

External links
 Official website

Economy of Iran
Economic research institutes
Research institutes in Iran
Government of the Islamic Republic of Iran